Minna Helmi Reijonen (born 13 October 1972 in Nilsiä) is a Finnish politician currently serving in the Parliament of Finland for the Finns Party at the Savonia-Karelia constituency.

References

1972 births
Living people
People from Nilsiä
Christian Democrats (Finland) politicians
Finns Party politicians
Members of the Parliament of Finland (2019–23)
21st-century Finnish women politicians
Women members of the Parliament of Finland